The International History Bee and Bowl (IHBB) are history quiz competitions for individual students and school teams outside the United States. Within the United States, students compete in the comparable National History Bee and Bowl; the same organization, International Academic Competitions, oversees the International and National (i.e. American) tournaments. The International History Bee and Bowl debuted in the 2011-2012 school year in Europe and Asia. A European Championship has been held since 2012; the Asian Championships debuted in spring 2014. In the 2014-15 school year, the Australian and New Zealand Division debuted as did the Canadian Division. Tournaments are held in approximately 30 countries each year. IHBB also organizes the International History Olympiad, which debuted in 2015 at The College of William and Mary in Williamsburg, Virginia, and was held in Hawaii in 2016 and Berlin in 2018. Students can qualify for the Olympiad by participating at IHBB tournaments around the world or by taking an official qualifying exam administered by a teacher if no IHBB tournament exists nearby.

The International History Bee and Bowl test knowledge of all aspects of history in a buzzer-based competition format, which bears a resemblance to some television quiz shows. However, unlike on a quiz show most IHBB questions are paragraph-length, and move from harder to easier information. When students think they know the answer, they ring in with the buzzer. If they are correct, they, or their team members get points, if incorrect, then the other students (in the History Bee) or the other team (in the History Bowl) has an opportunity to hear the rest of the question. All IHBB matches are conducted in English - tournaments in other languages may be added at some point in the future.

The International History Bee and Bowl World Championships are contested at the International History Olympiad. However, the International History Bowl World Championships features matches between teams of 2 or 3 students representing either a particular US state or country (or a mix of two or three of these) and is thus unlike any other International History Bowl competition. A full list of IHBB world champions is maintained on the International History Olympiad page.

Regional tournaments 

Regional tournaments are held throughout Asia, Europe, Canada, Australia, and New Zealand. Any school or student may attend as long as they have not participated at an earlier regional tournament that school year. Each tournament features a varsity division for students roughly 16–18 years of age, a junior varsity division for students roughly 13–15 years of age, and a middle school division for younger students.

Each tournament features a series of preliminary rounds for the History Bee for individual students and the History Bowl for teams. Students who finish in the top half in their age classification for the History Bee, and Bowl teams who finish the preliminary rounds with a .500 winning percentage or better qualify for their regional Championships, as well as the International History Olympiad. At the end of the preliminary rounds, the top Bee students advance to the Bee Finals, while Bowl teams are seeded according to their preliminary results and advance to the playoffs.

Championships 

Students and teams who finish in the top half of their regional tournament earn the right to compete at the Canadian, European and Asian Championships. The Championships also feature a Consolation Bee for students attending with their History Bowl team who did not qualify for the Bee Championships, as well as a Geography Bee which is open to all. The Championships in Europe and Asia also feature a separate Sports and Entertainment History Bee which is open to all participants, including coaches and also an all-subject team quiz competition, the Academic Bowl of Asia (or Europe).  Unique to the European Championship is a location related event played near or in a local attraction.  Past examples have included tournament finals held at the Palace of Versailles, the King Charle's Bridge, and the Colosseum.

The 2012 European Championships were held in Grasse, France; the 2013 and 2019 European Championships were held in Paris; the 2014 and 2017 Championships were in Rome, the 2015 Championships in Switzerland, the 2016 Championships were in Berlin, and the 2018 European Championships were held in Prague. The Asian Championships were held in Hong Kong in 2014, in Singapore in 2017, and in Khao Lak, Thailand in 2015, 2016, 2018, and 2019. The inaugural Canadian Championships were held in 2015, 2017, and 2019 in Ottawa, and the 2016 and 2018 Canadian Championships were held in Toronto.

Qualified students and schools from African and Middle Eastern countries are welcome to compete at either the IHBB European or Asian Championships, but not both in any given year.  Plans for expanding European and African offerings for the 2019-2020 school year exist.

International History Bee - European Division Champions

Varsity

Junior Varsity

Middle school

International History Bowl - European Division Champions

Varsity

Junior Varsity

Middle school

International History Bee - Asian Division Champions

Varsity

Junior Varsity

Middle school

International History Bowl - Asian Division Champions

Varsity

Junior Varsity

Middle school

International History Bee - Canadian Division Champions

Varsity

Junior Varsity

Middle school

International History Bowl - Canadian Division Champions

Varsity

Junior Varsity

Middle school

See also 
 National History Bee and Bowl

References

External links 

 

International Academic Competitions